Anting North railway station is a railway station on the Shanghai–Nanjing Intercity High-Speed Railway line located in Anting, Jiading District, Shanghai, China.

The Beijing–Shanghai high-speed railway passes beside this station, but does not stop. Anting West railway station is situated about 500 meters from the station.

Railway stations in Shanghai
Stations on the Shanghai–Nanjing Intercity Railway